In signal processing, the overlap–add method is an efficient way to evaluate the discrete convolution of a very long signal  with a finite impulse response (FIR) filter :

where  for m outside the region .

The concept is to divide the problem into multiple convolutions of h[n] with short segments of :

where L is an arbitrary segment length.  Then:

and y[n] can be written as a sum of short convolutions:

where the linear convolution  is zero outside the region .

where:
 DFTN and IDFTN refer to the Discrete Fourier transform and its inverse, evaluated over N discrete points, and
  is customarily chosen such that  is an integer power-of-2, and the transforms are implemented with the FFT algorithm, for efficiency.

Pseudocode
The following is a pseudocode of the algorithm:

 (Overlap-add algorithm for linear convolution)
 h = FIR_filter
 M = length(h)
 Nx = length(x)
 N = 8 × 2^ceiling( log2(M) )     (8 times the smallest power of two bigger than filter length M.  See next section for a slightly better choice.)
 step_size = N - (M-1)  (L in the text above)
 H = DFT(h, N)
 position = 0
 y(1 : Nx + M-1) = 0
 
 while position + step_size ≤ Nx do
     y(position+(1:N)) = y(position+(1:N)) + IDFT(DFT(x(position+(1:step_size)), N) × H)
     position = position + step_size
 end

Efficiency considerations

When the DFT and IDFT are implemented by the FFT algorithm, the pseudocode above requires about  complex multiplications for the FFT, product of arrays, and IFFT.  Each iteration produces  output samples, so the number of complex multiplications per output sample is about:

For example, when M=201 and N=1024,  equals 13.67, whereas direct evaluation of  would require up to 201 complex multiplications per output sample, the worst case being when both x and h are complex-valued.  Also note that for any given M,  has a minimum with respect to N.  Figure 2 is a graph of the values of N that minimize  for a range of filter lengths (M).

The total number of complex multiplications would be:

Comparatively, the number of complex multiplications required by the pseudocode algorithm is:

Hence the cost of the overlap–add method scales almost as  while the cost of a single, large circular convolution is almost .  The two methods are also compared in Figure 3, created by Matlab simulation.  The contours are lines of constant ratio of the times it takes to perform both methods.  When the overlap-add method is faster, the ratio exceeds 1, and ratios as high as 3 are seen.

See also
 Overlap–save method

Notes

References

Further reading

Signal processing
Transforms
Fourier analysis
Numerical analysis